Three Chord Opera is the twenty-fifth studio album by Neil Diamond, released in 2001. It marked the first album since 1974's Serenade to consist solely of original material written solely by Diamond, and the first album of any original songs since 1996's country-themed Tennessee Moon where he co-wrote all but one of the songs. 

The album also featured the song "I Believe in Happy Endings", written by Diamond for the 2001 comedy Saving Silverman in which he made a cameo.

The album reached number 15 on the Billboard 200 chart. "You are the Best Part of Me", reached No. 28 on the Billboard Adult Contemporary chart.

Track listing
All songs written by Neil Diamond.

Personnel 
 Neil Diamond – lead vocals 
 Alan Lindgren – arrangements (1, 3, 5, 6, 9), conductor (1, 3, 5, 9), keyboards (2, 4, 9), horn arrangements (2, 7), acoustic piano (3, 9), drums (4), percussion programming (4), Hammond organ (7, 9-12)
 Tom Hensley – acoustic piano (2, 3, 7, 10, 12), Fender Rhodes (6, 8, 11)
 Marc Mann – programming (3, 9), sequencing (3), backing vocals (9)
 Jeff Turzo – additional programming (4)
 Dominic Ordinaire – accordion (8)
 Hadley Hockensmith – acoustic guitar (1, 9), 12-string guitar (1), electric guitar (2, 5, 8, 9), guitar (3, 6, 7, 11, 12), guitar solo (8)
 Doug Rhone – electric guitar (1), acoustic guitar (2, 5), guitar (6, 8, 12), tiple (7, 11)
 Michael Thompson – electric guitar (1, 5, 7, 9), guitar solo (2), guitar (3, 4)
 Jaydee Manes – pedal steel guitar (10)
 Reinie Press – bass (1, 2, 5, 6, 7, 9, 10, 12)
 Chuck Domanico – bass (11)
 Ron Tutt – drums (1, 5, 7, 8, 10, 11, 12)
 Russ Kunkel – drums (2, 3, 6, 9)
 Peter Asher – percussion (1, 2, 3, 5, 6, 10, 12), programming (9), backing vocals (9), autoharp (11, 12)
 Vince Charles – percussion (5, 7, 10), tambourine (1, 11), steel drums (6), congas (6, 8), marimba (8)
 Don Markese – clarinet (1), baritone saxophone (2, 7)
 Larry Klimas – tenor saxophone (2, 7)
 Everette Harp – tenor saxophone (3)
 Emilio Castillo – tenor saxophone (9)
 Norbert Satchel – tenor saxophone (9)
 Stephen "Doc" Kupka – baritone saxophone (9)
 Daniel Fornero – trumpet (2, 7)
 Ralf Rickert –  trumpet (2, 7)
 Greg Adams – trumpet (9), horn arrangements (9)
 Adolfo Acosta – trumpet (9)
 Michael Bogart – trumpet (9), trombone (9)
 Susie Katayama – cello (6)
 Assa Drori – concertmaster (1, 3, 5, 9), violin (6)
 Evan Wilson – violin (6)
 Shari Zippert – violin (6)
 Linda Press – harmony vocals (5)
 Colin Mitchell – backing vocals (9)
 Wendy Worth – backing vocals (9)
 Alvin Chea – backing vocals (10, 12)
 Craig Copeland – backing vocals (10, 12)
 Randy Crenshaw – backing vocals (10, 12)
 Robert Joyce – backing vocals (10, 12)
 Luana Jackman – chorus master (11), vocal contractor

Production
 Producers – Peter Asher (All tracks); Alan Lindgren (Tracks 1, 2, 4-8, 10-12)
 Production Coordination – Ivy Skoff
 Album Coordination – Sam Cole
 Recorded, Mixed and Mastered by Bernie Becker
 Assistant Recording – Colin Mitchell 
 Assistant Mixing – Alan Mason
 Recorded at Arch Angel Studios (Los Angeles, CA) and Sony Pictures Studios (Culver City, CA).
 Mixed at Conway Studios (Hollywood, CA).
 Mastered at Bernie Becker Mastering  
 Art Direction – Gabrielle Raumberger
 Design – Samantha Ahdoot
 Photography – Rocky Schenck

Certifications

References

2001 albums
Neil Diamond albums
Albums produced by Peter Asher
Columbia Records albums